NBC News Daily is an American daytime news program that premiered on NBC on September 12, 2022. Produced by NBC News, the program is hosted by Kate Snow, Aaron Gilchrist, Vicky Nguyen and Morgan Radford.

Anchor schedule 
Morgan Radford & Vicky Nguyen anchor the broadcast on NBC (for one hour depending on affiliate scheduling) & NBC News Now (in its entirety) 12pm - 2pm ET.
Kate Snow & Aaron Gilchrist anchor the broadcast on NBC (for one hour depending on affiliate scheduling) & NBC News Now (in its entirety) 2pm-4pm ET (4pm Eastern is a recorded version but is updated for breaking news)

History 
NBC News Daily was announced on August 3, 2022. The program replaced NBC's long-running soap opera Days of Our Lives on the network's daytime lineup after it moved exclusively to NBCUniversal's streaming service Peacock the same day. The program offers "up-to-the-minute national and international news", and provides the option for NBC affiliates to add local news inserts. It is also simulcast on NBC News' streaming channel NBC News Now. NBC News Daily competes primarily with ABC's GMA3: What You Need To Know (which is produced by the staff of the ABC News streaming channel ABC News Live)

References 

NBC original programming
2022 American television series debuts
2020s American television news shows
English-language television shows
NBC News